Haldane is a surname and a given name. It may also refer to:

 Haldane (lunar crater)
 Haldane (Martian crater)
 Haldane, Illinois, United States, an unincorporated community